Francisco Gregorio Billini Aristi (May 25, 1844 – November 28, 1898 in Santo Domingo) was a Dominican writer, pedagogue, and politician. Supported by the former president Ulises Heureaux, he won the national elections in 1884, and served as the 23rd president of the Dominican Republic, from September 1, 1884 to May 16, 1885. He resigned in 1885 to avoid creating a civil war as he found opposition, as Gregorio Luperon believed he was Ulises Heureaux puppet and a way of the dictator to maintain political power while Heureaux opposed him when Billini's policies affected his power and interests in the country.

Family background and early life 
The son of Maria de Regla Aristi Guerrero and Hipolito Billini Hernandez, his grandfather Juan Antonio Billini Ruse, a native of Piedmont, Italy, arrived in the island of Santo Domingo with the 1802 French troops commanded by General Charles Leclerc (Napoleon's brother in law) in order to reassert control over a slave rebellion on the western side of the island (currently the Republic of Haiti), eventually capturing and deporting Toussaint Louverture.

Young Billini did his primary and secondary education in his hometown in the College of Father Boneau, where he learned to write in Latin and Italian (he also spoke Italian perfectly, having learned from his Italian grandfather as a boy). He went to the Theological Seminary St. Thomas Aquinas where he was a disciple of Fernando Arturo de Merino.

He was the nephew of Francisco Xavier Billini, known in the Dominican Republic as "Padre Billini" (Father Billini) who founded in 1882 the still running National Lottery of the Dominican Republic.

Political career 
Motivated by his militancy in the Blue party and his conviction that the country should preserve its independence, he participated at the age of 21 in the Dominican Restoration War, that ended in 1865. During the War he was trapped by the Spanish troops and in 1865 was exchanged in Puerto Plata after a treaty was made between the Dominican and Spanish troops.

After the Restoration War ended, the Dominican Republic experienced some years of political turmoil, which ended when Buenaventura Baez started his so called "6 year government". Billini was known as one of the primary opponents of Buenaventura Baez government, first through publications and later as part of an armed rebellion against Baez. This costed him the exile in 1868.

On his return to the country he served as a civil servant becoming Representative for Azua (1874), Minister of Finance (1878), Minister of War and Navy (1880). He was Vice President of the Dominican Republic from 5 March to 8 July 1878 in the cabinet of Cesareo Guillermo. He was the president of the Senate of the Dominican Republic in 1878-1879. Later he announced intentions to become President of the Dominican Republic.

Presidency 
In 1884, after a close electoral contest in which he beat Casimiro Nemesio de Moya, he was elected President of the Republic. He took office on September 1, 1884 and resigned on May 16, 1885. His unexpected resignation puzzled many of his followers. His last words as president were:I think it is a good example to be giving my resignation spontaneously and disappearing into the shadows of my house, without petty aspirations for the future.

Other works and legacy 
He founded the newspaper El Eco de la Opinion (March 1879), which circulated for over twenty years and became the paradigm of a thoughtful journalism combined with detailed news reviews. He collaborated regularly with El Nacional, El Cable, Letras y Ciencias, El Mensajero and El Patriota.

Before he was president, he published the novel Amor y Expiacion in 1882, however the most important contributions of Billini to the Dominican national literature is the novel Baní or Engracia and Antoñita (1892), which prosecutes the political-social behavior and customs of nineteenth-century banilejos.

He died in Santo Domingo on 28 November 1898. In 1998 his remains were transferred to the National Pantheon in Santo Domingo by order of President Leonel Fernandez. Currently one of the stations of the Santo Domingo Metro carries his name.

References

 Biography on Wiki Biography
 Biography on Biographies and Life
  on EnCaribe
 A biographical note on the newspaper Hoy of the Dominican Republic

|-

|-

1844 births
1898 deaths
19th-century Dominican Republic politicians
People from Santo Domingo
Presidents of the Dominican Republic
Vice presidents of the Dominican Republic
Presidents of the Senate of the Dominican Republic
Finance ministers of the Dominican Republic
Dominican Republic people of Basque descent
Dominican Republic people of Italian descent
Dominican Republic male writers